Enfield Square, formerly Westfield Shoppingtown Enfield Square, is an enclosed shopping mall in Enfield, Connecticut.  The mall is owned by the Namdar Realty Group. At , Enfield Square is the 10th largest mall in the state of Connecticut, containing 54 shops, all on one level.  As of 2018, there was only a single anchor store: Target.

History
May Centers, the mall development branch of May Department Stores, built the Enfield Square, which opened in 1971, with three anchor stores: G. Fox, JCPenney and Steiger's. In 1993, G. Fox was converted to a Filene's store as a result of a merger. Steiger's ceased operations at the east side of the mall in 1994 when the chain went out of business. In 1996, the owner of the mall, CenterMark Properties, was acquired by the Westfield Group.

On April 26, 1997, Sears opened in the space formerly occupied by Steiger's.

In 1998, the property, valued at $50 million, was transferred to Enfield Square LLC and was rebranded as Westfield Shoppingtown Enfield Square.

In August 2000, JCPenney closed as a result of a nationwide closing of unprofitable stores. The space remained vacant until Filene's expanded operations by moving its men's and home departments there in February 2001. Target built a new anchor on the north side of the mall in October 2001. In 2006, both of the Filene's stores were rebranded as Macy's after yet another merger. Additionally, the Westfield Group sold the property to Australia-based Centro Properties Group for $80 million, which its joint venture subsidiary Centro Watt (now Brixmor Property Group) managed the property. In 2012, Brixmor Property Group hired Madison Marquette to manage the Enfield Square.

In January 2016, Macy's announced they were closing both of the locations at the mall as a result of a nationwide closing of unprofitable stores.

In February 2016, J.P. Morgan Chase foreclosed on the mall after Brixmor Property Group (Centro Enfield LLC), defaulted on a $240 million loan taken out in 2006 for renovation purposes.

On August 7, 2016, the Ruby Tuesday location at the mall closed.

On December 28, 2016, Sears announced that it would close its Enfield Square location in April 2017 as part of a plan to close 150 stores nationwide which left Target as the only remaining anchor store. Party City moved their Enfield location into the mall in 2017.

On April 25, 2017, Express announced that its Enfield Square location would be closed on May 6, 2017.

In June 2018, KeyPoint Partners was chosen to manage the mall.

The property was sold by J.P. Morgan Chase through online auction company Ten-X.com on December 12, 2018 for $10.85 million, however, the buyer was not identified. On January 15, 2019, it was announced that the property was purchased by New York-based Namdar Realty Group.

On January 25, 2020, the Enfield Planning and Zoning Commission unanimously voted to approve Namdar Realty Group's proposal to resubdivide the property into 13 parcels as part of a redevelopment plan.

During the summer of 2022, the roof covering the old Macy's store collapsed. The Town of Enfield has stepped in to remediate this dangerous situation after numerous requests to the landlord have gone unanswered. A lien of $44,000 has been placed on the property to cover the cost of the work performed.

References

External links

Shopping malls in Connecticut
Enfield, Connecticut
Shopping malls established in 1971
Tourist attractions in Hartford County, Connecticut
Buildings and structures in Hartford County, Connecticut
1971 establishments in Connecticut
Namdar Realty Group